Three Italian artists went by the name of Pomarancio or Il Pomarancio (indicating a native of Pomarance):

Antonio Circignani (1570-1630)
Niccolò Circignani (1520-1597)
Cristoforo Roncalli ( - 1626)